Furu may refer to:
 Fermented bean curd
 Furu language (Central Sudanic family)
 Furu languages (Southern Bantoid family)
 Furu, a 2014 album by Belgian band Arsenal